The Australian cricket team toured India in 1979 to play a six-match Test series against India.

India won the series 2-0. It was the last series played by an Australian side before the compromise agreement between the Australian Cricket Board and World Series Cricket. It was the first time India had beaten Australia in a series.

Australian squad
Australia had just lost the Ashes to England 5-1 and drawn against Pakistan 1-1 during the 1978–79 summer. They had also finished a poor 1979 World Cup campaign.

The squad selected by Ray Lindwall, Sam Loxton and Phil Ridings were as follows:
Batsmen – Kim Hughes (captain), Andrew Hilditch (vice-captain), Allan Border, Rick Darling, Graham Yallop (also reserve wicketkeeper), Graeme Wood, Dav Whatmore
Fast bowlers – Rodney Hogg, Graeme Porter, Alan Hurst, Geoff Dymock
Spinners – Peter Sleep, Bruce Yardley, Jim Higgs
Wicketkeepers – Kevin Wright
Team officials – Bob Merriman (manager), Frank Hennessy (physio)

The team was very inexperienced, with ten of the players never having toured before, and none having gone to India. Jeff Moss, Trevor Laughlin and Gary Cosier, who had been part of the 1979 World Cup squad, were not selected – they were replaced by Wood, Higgs, Sleep and Yardley. Peter Toohey, who had impressed with the bat in Australia's 3-2 victory over India in 1977–78, was also overlooked due to a poor 1978–79 test season. John Inverarity, the highly experienced Western Australian captain and former test player, appears never to have been considered for selection, despite a fine domestic season of cricket in 1978–79.

Captaincy
Although Graham Yallop had captained Australia during the 1978–79 summer, he was replaced by Kim Hughes when injured, and when Yallop returned to the side, the Australian Cricket Board decided to persist with Hughes. They also elected Hilditch as vice captain rather than Yallop. However Yallop was kept as a selector.

On-tour selection panel: Hughes, Hilditch, Yallop.

Replacements
Alan Hurst suffered a back injury during the tour. On 16 October it was decided he would return home and Geoff Lawson was flown out as a replacement bowler during the tour.

World Series Cricket Backdrop
Before the tour took place, establishment cricket had "made up" with World Series Cricket and the 1979–80 Australian summer season was to be the first in three years with all players in the one competition. However, World Series Cricket players were not selected on the India tour. The scheduling of the tour meant that the players chosen to go to India would miss out on the first round of Sheffield Shield games in Australia and only have two weeks to press their claims for selection before the first test in Australia.

Cricket writer Samir Chopra later wrote:
The names of the tourists that year were a mixture of the giggle-inducing and the dramatic. It was the autumn of 1979, and the last Packer-depleted Australia side to turn out for the ACB was in India. Those of us that greeted them that year knew little of what reluctant tourists they were, about how they felt cheated and betrayed by their overlords, and how they griped and belly-ached about their touring and playing conditions... All we knew was that Indian cricket was suspended in a bizarre netherworld, one where the world's best cricket players all seemed to be playing in a poorly attended circus in Australia, while second-stringers were sent to our shores. But I still thought the Packer players were mercenaries and still paid obeisance to nation-based cricket, so these players were going to get all my attention.

Tour
The Australian team left for Madras on 21 August. Hughes:
It will be a great experience for us to play in India — an Australian team hasn't been there for 10 years. It will be a real challenge as India is certain to be very hard to beat on its home grounds... We will have plenty of eye-catching performances in both batting and bowling and I'm sure paceman Rodney Hogg is going to be a success on Indian wickets along with spinners Jim Higgs, Peter Sleep and Bruce Yardley. I feel that players of the class of all-rounder Allan Border, batsmen Rick Darling and Graham Yallop and hopefully myself, will produce efforts that will win us matches and also please the crowds.
The team was on a plane when the engine blew one hour out of Singapore and had to return. This meant the Australians arrived in India 22 hours behind schedule.

The Australians spent a week in Madras to acclimatise. After arriving at Madras, Rick Darling and Jim Higgs both fell sick with stomach ailments. However the mood was optimistic and the key players seemed in good form at practice sessions. According to one report:
Yallop, in particular, is in masterly touch. His driving today was fluent and effortless, and his teammates agree he had never been batting better. In that sort of form, he is destined to score a lot of runs on this tour. Hughes is always busy at the nets, offering advice and encouragement to his players. He gave Allan Hurst a private batting clinic today and then turned his attention to Sleep, who is gradually getting his confidence back after a difficult beginning to the tour.

North Zone vs Australia
The first game of the tour was against North Zone in Srinagar, 1,600 miles from Madras. The ACB requested the game be relocated closer to Madras to reduce travel time and because Sringara was politically volatile due to the Kashmir situation, but this was knocked back as it was the first time a visiting test team had played in Kashmir and advance ticket sales were heavy.

Rodney Hogg and Graeme Wood pulled out prior to the game due to illness. There was heavy security due to threats to kill the Australians from the Pakistan-based Jammu and Kashmir Liberation Front.

Runs were scored by Hilditch (71), Hughes (70) and Yallop (83) with Hilditch and Rick Darling having a 75 run opening stand in 90 minutes. Hurst took 5-33 and Dymock 4-25 (twice dismissing Arun Lal – who scored 99 – on no balls). The game was drawn.

South Zone vs Australia
The next game took place against South Zone in Hyderabad. Hogg, Higgs and Sleep all took three wickets in South Zone's first innings. Alan Border scored 113 – his first decent score since his debut century against Pakistan – and Yallop made another half century; Kevin Wright made 52. The match was interrupted by rain and Australia were unable to force a victory, although Higgs and Sleep both picked up two extra wickets in South Zone's second innings.

Rodney Hogg had taken four wickets in all despite being pelted by fruit and other missiles during the game, resulting in Hughes asking the police to stop them. Hogg was hit by an apple core on the final day, which he threw back into the crowd. This inspired more items to be thrown at him – a large stone hit him in the groin.

It was felt by contemporary reports that Higgs out-bowled Sleep:
Sleep also took five wickets, but three of them were from loose deliveries which a batsman of Gavaskar's class would put away. He does have the happy knack of taking wickets with bad balls, but there are doubts about his ability to bowl tightly enough against batsmen who were brought up playing spin bowling.
Rick Darling was cut over the left eye while fielding and needed stitches, meaning he was unable to bat at all. The selectors had wanted to experiment with Graeme Wood at six but Darling's injury meant Wood had to open. The game also saw Graeme Porter make his first class debut for Australia.

First Test

Rick Darling's illness was a headache for the Australian selectors – he was first choice opener with Wood as a backup, and either Wood or Dav Whatmore to bat at six. Hughes wanted to take three pacemen into the test, Dymock, Hurst and Hogg, leaving room for one spinner – Higgs. Eventually Darling was ruled out and Wood and Whatmore were selected, with Yardley as 12th man.

India kept a similar team to that which had played in England, with Dilip Doshi making his test debut. According to Wisden:
Ironically, the Australians were better acclimatised than the home side, having practised in these conditions for almost a week, with two pre-Test matches. The Indians, however, had just returned from England, the Test match starting only a week after the end of the epic fourth test at The Oval. Besides being travel-weary, they had to adjust hurriedly to vast differences in weather, light and pitch conditions.
Australia began well with centuries to Border (162) and Hughes (100), who had a record third wicket partnership of 222. The other Australians batted less well (although several made starts), with Doshi taking 6-103. India scored 425 in reply, with Kapil Dev making 83 off 73 balls; Jim Higgs took 7-143. Hogg made 2-85. According to Wisden:
The presence of Hogg in the Australian attack presumably influenced the preparation of a pitch slower than usual at Chepauk. As it was the Indians were hardly disconcerted by Hogg who, apart from being unable to achieve any pace, had immense trouble in keeping his front foot behind the popping crease. The bowler to test the Indian batting was Higgs, who was remarkably tidy for a leg-spinner... suffering only at the hands of Kapil Dev.
All the Australian bowlers struggled in the heat, and Higgs at times struggled to grip the ball; Hogg was also plagued with no balls. Border and Yallop both bowled and Yallop took a wicket.

Australia responded well in the second innings at first, with Hilditch and Border scoring half centuries as they went to 1-103. However a collapse saw Australia crash to 7-175, a lead of only a 140 with a session and a half to go. "When I got out I thought that was it", admitted Hughes later.

However Geoff Dymock and Rodney Hogg held out for an hour, then the match was washed out with rain and ended in a draw.

Hughes later said he felt Australia were lucky to draw. "We were in a golden position on the first day, and half way through the second day, but we blew it", he said. "We should have got ourselves into a position where we couldn't lose, and then kept the pressure on India... Obviously we'll be paying a lot of attention to our batting. I thought the top-order batsmen were very disappointing".

Second Test

There were some doubts the second test would start as scheduled due to a monsoon.

Rick Darling replaced Whatmore in the side, with Wood dropping down to number six. Bruce Yardley came in for Dymock. Shivlav Ladal made his test debut for India.

Australia won the toss and batted, with Hilditch and Hughes scoring half centuries. However they collaposed to be 5-294 to 333 all out. India's innings was marked by problems involving Rodney Hogg. According to Wisden:
Hogg could not work up speed, and at the start of the Indian innings again had trouble landing his front foot in the right place. After being no balled seven times in five overs delivered from different ends, Hogg lost his temper on the second evening and kicked down the stumps. The incident would have fouled the atmosphere had Hughes not taken prompt action, tendering an immediate apology to the umpire and persuading Hogg to express his regret at the end of the day's play. 
Bob Merriman later announced that it was decided no disciplinary action would be taken against Hogg. He wound up with figures of 0-118 off 32 overs, the first time he had failed to take a wicket in a test. Hurst took 0-93; Yardley had figures of 4-107, but was too ill to bowl towards the end as India declared at 5-457.

Rick Darling had left the field while Australia was fielding and was too ill to open so Wood took his place. Australia were 3-77 in reply, 47 behind India's first innings total, at tea on the fifth day, when a rain storm caused the game to be abandoned. Yadav ended up taking 7-87 for the match.

Australia vs Central Zone
Australia then travelled to Nagpur for a tour game against Central Zone. Peter Sleep threw his name into consideration with 5-71 and 61 not out; Darling (82) and Whatmore (60) also found form in a drawn game. Hogg however only took 1-39 and 1-13 and there were doubts raised about whether he should be picked – the first time this had happened in his career. "It's something new for him and it will be important for us to see how he handles it", said Hughes. However Hurst's back was playing up and he was advised to rest; this made Hogg's selection more imperative.

Third Test

Australia kept faith with Hogg for the third test, bringing in Dymock to replace Hurst. India won the toss and elected to bat; they were 1-201 but the Australian attack fired and they were dismissed for 271, Dymock taking 5-99 and Hogg 4-66 (though he was still no balled 13 times in 15 overs). Darling had more health issues, injuring his shoulder while fielding and having to leave the ground; it turned out to be sprained, and Darling batted down the order, with Bruce Yardley opening.

Australia were unable to press the advantage although they managed to score 304, led by Yallop (89), Hughes (50) and Darling (59); for a time it seemed Darling was not going to be able to bat but he decided to try and ended up lasting three hours.

India batted well in their second innings making 311. Dymock took 7/67 but Australia dropped a number of key catches which later proved crucial.

Australia were set the task of getting 279 in 310 minutes. Alan Border was suffering from flu so Yallop batted at three (Border came in at six). The Australians collapsed and were all out for 125, Dev and Yadav taking four wickets each.

To make things worse for Australia, Bruce Yardley was injured when a Kapil Dev yorker struck him on the big toe of the left foot, causing him to swell up and putting him in doubt for the fourth test.

Australia vs West Zone
The next game was against West Zone. Hughes scored 126 but the rest of the batsmen failed. West Zone were dismissed for 217 with Sleep and Higgs taking three wickets each – and Graeme Wood a career-best 3-18. Australia made 9-143 in their second innings (Whatmore 41), then Border and Higgs each took three wickets as they almost bowled Australia to victory, the game ending with West Zone 7-95.

Alan Hurst had returned to the Australian side for the game but it became apparent the injury was getting worse. It was decided that he should be sent home after the fourth test and be replaced by Geoff Lawson. Hughes:
He really struggled for his rhythm and line. He just can't get around. He's very disappointed. He was hopeful he might put up with it and carry on, but it's no use now. He might have to have a complete rest if he wants to do himself justice. There's no point in him staying in India if he can't bowl. He's lost everything. On his form against West Zone you just couldn't play him anymore. He's still got a lot of cricket left in him and he could do himself permanent damage. He hadn't done any work at all for a week, and he's now as unfit as he has ever been in his career.
Bob Merriman said Hurst was:
Bitterly disappointed. It's a shame for this to happen to Alan. He's no sloucher. I don't think he's ever come off a cricket ground in his life. He will be staying with us throughout the fourth Test. With Bruce Yardley also injured, Alan wants to help with other duties in any way he can. That's the sort of person he is.

Fourth Test

Australia replaced Bruce Yardley with Peter Sleep. Gavaskar (dropped on 13), Viswanath and Sharma all scored centuries as India made 7-510, with Dymock taking 4-135. Australia made 298 in response due to fine innings from Whatmore (77) and Wright (55); Kapil Dev took 5-82; Graham Yallop had to bat in a different position due to illness.

India enforced the follow on. Australia managed to bat to safety with a total of 413 with good innings from Hilditch (85), Hughes (40), Border (46), Whatmore (54) and Sleep (64). The partnership of Whatmore and Sleep in particular – 76 off 102 minutes – was especially crucial. Both Wright and Higgs were severely ill due to stomach upsets.

Hughes called this effort "the best all-round team effort from any side that I've ever played in, especially considering all the circumstances".

East Zone vs Australia
Australia played East Zone in Cuttack with Geoff Lawson joining the team; Kevin Wright was rested for the first time on tour, with Graham Yallop taking the gloves.

Australia scored 5-160 (Yallop 81 not out) when Hughes declared; East Zone were dismissed for 126 in return; Australia were 8-119 when Hughes declared again, 50 minutes before tea. This gave East Zone a day and a half to score 153 runs. Hughes explained the generosity of this declaration by stating he was unhappy with the quality of the Cuttack pitch, saying it was one of the worst he had ever played on, and thus of limited use to his team; the idea was to win in two games to give the side more time to prepare for the test match in Calcutta. It did not work out that way; East Zone were 4-111 by the end of that day and ended up winning the game by four wickets (two catches were dropped).

Fifth Test

Australia made only one change for the fifth test team, bringing Bruce Yardley back for Peter Sleep. Initially the Australians were reluctant to use a still-injured Yardley but a look at the spin friendly Eden Gardens pitch made them change their minds. Hughes:
It's a certainty that Yardley is going to have to play on this wicket. Obviously he will have some pain, but he will not do any irreparable damage. The results of another x-ray on the toe have given him cause for optimism and he is pleased in his own mind. He has experienced some discomfort in the nets, but it's not enough to stop him playing. He's a must in the team and I'm sure he can do the job.
Australia batted extremely well in their first innings, making 442 thanks to Yallop (167) (as opener), Hughes (92), Border (54), and Yardley (61). Indian managed 347 in reply, collapsing from 2-256 with Yardley getting 4-91.

Australia were 5-81 in reply in one stage, in danger of losing, but Hughes started hitting out and Australia added 70 in 72 minutes. Hughes declared (he was on 64 not out), leaving India to get 246 runs in 247 minutes. Geoff Dymock took four wickets and at one stage India were 4-123 but Yashpal Sharma and Rao dug in and the game ended drawn, with them 4-200. According to Wisden:
Although the ball had turned on the fourth day – a factor in Hughes's declaration – the heavy roller produced a calmer pitch on the final day. Lacking in bounce, it was of little use to the wrist-spin of Higgs, and Australia's only finger-spinner, Yardley, failed to reproduce his form of the Indian first innings.

Sixth Test
{{Test match
| date = 3 – 7 November 1979
| team1 = 
| team2 = 

| score-team1-inns1 = 458/8d (149 overs)
| runs-team1-inns1 = Sunil Gavaskar 123 (239)
| wickets-team1-inns1 = Rodney Hogg 2/53 (28 overs)

| score-team2-inns1 = 160 (61.5 overs)
| runs-team2-inns1 = Graham Yallop 60 (125)
| wickets-team2-inns1 = Dilip Doshi 5/43 (19.5 overs)

| score-team1-inns2 = 
| runs-team1-inns2 = 
| wickets-team1-inns2 = 

| score-team2-inns2 = 198 (f/o) (73.1 overs)
| runs-team2-inns2 = Kim Hughes 80 (144)
| wickets-team2-inns2 = Kapil Dev 4/39 (14.1 overs)

| result = India won by an innings and 100 runs
| report = Scorecard
| venue = Wankhede Stadium, Bombay
| umpires = JD Ghosh and MI Ghouse
| motm = 
| toss = India won the toss and elected to bat.
| rain = 5 November was taken as a rest day.The match was scheduled for five days but completed in four.| notes = 
}}

Australia made one change for the sixth test, bringing back Sleep for Bruce Yardley, after the latter failed a fitness test. India won the toss and decided to bat, making 8-458, with both Gavaskar and Kirmani scoring centuries. Graham Yallop and Sleep both had to leave the ground during the day due to illness.

Australia were dismissed for 160, with only Yallop (60) offering much resistance. According to Wisden, "the Australians were upset by two umpiring decisions during this innings. Hilditch was aggrieved at being given run out and Hughes was even less pleased to be given out caught at silly point. There was a red patch on his shirt-sleeve to provide evidence that justice had not been done."

Australia were 2-149 in their second innings (Border 61, Hughes 80) but then collapsed to be all out for 198 and lost by an innings and 100 runs. Wisden later called Hughes' knock "one of the finest innings played against Indian bowling in recent times."

During the second innings, Dev felled Rick Darling with a bouncer, causing him to be retired hurt.

Summary
The tour established Kim Hughes and Allan Border as test batsmen. However it was a disappointing tour for Australian strike bowler Rodney Hogg.

Hughes thought key problems were the failure of the Australian openers to get off to a good start, and dropping of crucial catches. Hughes:
Not enough of us came up to scratch... Rodney Hogg was disappointing. He took a long while to get to grips with the conditions. We expected our openers to play an important role, but Rick Darling, Andrew Hilditch and Graeme Wood struggled the whole way. That was a big blow to us.
In the words of Samir Chopra:
The series had many moments of personal success for Hughes' team, but the Australians were always just a bit outgunned and outmatched, and given that they were never very happy, the result was a foregone conclusion. Still, they showed fight, their batsmen played spin reasonably (Border and Hughes especially well), and their captain showed himself to be more enterprising than his Indian counterpart. As was their wont, and still is now, India failed to win more comprehensively against a much weaker team.Wisden'' summed up the tour for the Australians:
The main Australian gain of the tour was the tremendous advance made by two batsmen, Hughes and Border. Between the first Test and the last there was a marked development in Hughes's technique of playing spin bowling, and happily the heavy burden of captaincy had no adverse effect on his batting... He passed the half-century mark in every Test but one and could certainly have made more runs had he not batted as positively and purposefully as he did. Border... started the series more strongly than he finished it. But as his form declined, another left-hander, Yallop, came into his own. The most experienced player in the side, Yallop was at his best when batting conditions were most difficult. In the last two Tests, he opened the innings and filled the rôle with distinction. If he did not make an earlier impact on the series it was partly because, more than once, he was dismissed in unfortunate ways. A major weakness of the Australian batting was its fragility at the top of the order... The best Australian opening partnership in the entire series was one of 32. Yet this was not Australia's only weakness, nor the most prominent. It was the lack of depth to their bowling and their generally poor out-cricket that put them at such a disadvantage. On the few occasions when their bowlers rose to any heights, they were let down by the fielders, with many more slip chances going down than were held. Fitness problems also were acute.
Back in Australia, the next test played was against the West Indies. Eight of the twelve players selected were from World Series Cricket, including Greg Chappell as captain, but Hughes, Border, Hogg and Dymock were kept in the side and Hughes was appointed vice-captain.

References

External links
 Australian cricket team in India 1979-80 at CricketArchive
Australian cricket team in India 1979 at Test Cricket Tours
Australian cricket team in India in 1979 at Cricinfo

1979 in Australian cricket
1979 in Indian cricket
1980 in Australian cricket
1980 in Indian cricket
1979-80
Indian cricket seasons from 1970–71 to 1999–2000
International cricket competitions from 1975–76 to 1980